Jakki Rubin, (born May 15, 1976), better known by his stage name Jakki tha Motamouth, is an American rapper from Columbus, Ohio. He is a member of MHz Legacy. He was part of the group The Weathermen. Originally released in 2004, his first solo album, God vs. Satan, was re-released in 2005. He's best known for his punchlines and excellent storytelling ability.

Discography

Albums
 God vs. Satan (2005)
 Psycho Circus (2008)

Singles
 "Widespread" b/w "The Chosen" (2000)
 "I'm Trying" (2003)

Guest appearances
RJD2 - "F.H.H." from Deadringer (2002)
Copywrite - "Nobody" and "Theme Music" from The High Exhaulted (2002)
Vakill - "Forbidden Scriptures" from The Darkest Cloud (2003)
Greenhouse Effect - "You Must Learn" from Columbus or Bust (2005)
Killah Priest - "Fire Reign" from The 3 Day Theory (2010)
Copywrite - "Swaggot Killaz" from God Save the King (2012)
Casual x J. Rawls - "Hier-O-Dot" from Respect Game or Expect Flames (2012)

References

Further reading

External links
 

Rappers from Columbus, Ohio
Underground rappers
Living people
1976 births
21st-century American rappers
The Weathermen (hip hop group) members
MHz Legacy members